Pontevedra Club de Fútbol B, S.A.D. is a Spanish football team based in Pontevedra, Galicia. It was founded in 1965, and currently plays in the Spanish Primera Autonómica – Group Five. It's the reserve team of Pontevedra CF.

Season to season

7 seasons in Tercera División

Notable former players
 Kelvin Onosiughe
 Marcelo Santiago
 Miguel Loureiro

External links
Official website
Unofficial site
Futbolme.com profile
Unofficial forum
Furya Granate, ultras blog
Furya Granate website

Football clubs in Galicia (Spain)
Spanish reserve football teams
Association football clubs established in 1965
 
Divisiones Regionales de Fútbol clubs
1965 establishments in Spain